Laura Leclair (born 15 January 1997) is a Canadian cross-country skier.

Career

Junior
At the 2020 Nordic Junior World Ski Championships in Oberwiesenthal, Germany, Leclair had a 20th-place finish in the U-23 skate ski race.

Senior
At the FIS Nordic World Ski Championships 2021, Leclair at her first senior FIS World Championships. Along with Dahria Beatty, Cendrine Browne, and Katherine Stewart-Jones, finished 9th in the 4x5km relay, Canada's best result in 20 years in the event.

At the Canadian Olympic Cross-country skiing trials in January 2022, Leclair went onto win the individual sprint event, clinching her a spot on the 2022 Olympic team.

On January 13, 2022, Leclair was officially named to Canada's 2022 Olympic team.

Cross-country skiing results
All results are sourced from the International Ski Federation (FIS).

Olympic Games

World Championships

World Cup

Season standings

References

1997 births
Living people
Canadian female cross-country skiers
People from Chelsea, Quebec
Cross-country skiers at the 2022 Winter Olympics
Olympic cross-country skiers of Canada